is a Japanese manga created by Makoto Kubota. It started serialization on Square Enix's seinen manga magazine Young Gangan from December 3, 2004 to December 19, 2014. An anime adaptation produced by AIC A.S.T.A. aired from October 3, 2008 to March 27, 2009 in Japan. The second season of the anime started airing on October 3, 2009. Each manga chapter and anime episode is referred to as a FIGHT.

On October 26, 2018, it was announced that Makoto Kubota was working on a new Astro Fighter Sunred work and he plans to self-publish it.

Plot
Astro Fighter Sunred is a parody of the Sentai superhero genre, most notably of the Super Sentai series.

The story revolves around the Tama River area, based mostly in Kawasaki City Kanagawa where battles are fought between the evil organisation Florsheim and the ally of justice Sunred. The twist is that Sunred (referred to most characters familiar with him as simply 'Red') is a rough-talking, violent and rude hero while the villains of Florsheim (led by General Vamp) are for the most part polite, conscientious and easy-going.

Despite this, both sides still stay true to their roles, with Florsheim dedicated to destroying Sunred and taking over the world while Sunred battles against them. Other evil organisations and heroes are also mentioned from time to time.

Each episode is divided into various shorts of varying length. Most of the humour comes from the interactions of the characters, especially the main trio of Sunred, his girlfriend Kayoko and General Vamp. Kayoko and Vamp, for example, get along very well and she occasionally consults him about housework or cooking. In contrast, she and Sunred often argue like a long married couple.

Characters

Main characters

 Sunred is the protagonist of the Astro Fighter Sunred, referred by most as 'Red-san' which is a reversal of his name in romaji. Despite being an ally of justice, Red does not come off as being heroic much of the time and comes off rude and violent, as well as impatient and impulsive. In addition, he wears regular clothing even when fighting Florsheim's monsters (generally a t-shirt and shorts). The only signs that show he is a hero is his superhuman strength and the fact he inexplicably wears his helmet all the time. He is somehow able to smoke and eat through the helmet, despite the fact that it covers his entire head.

 Kayoko is Sunred's girlfriend, your usual working woman who has a job at an insurance firm and apparently supports Red financially, though annoyed at him asking her for money. Like Red, she is unafraid to speak her mind and knows that deep down he cares for her deeply. Kayoko gets along very well with General Vamp, and the two often talk. On occasion, she even asks him for advice on housework.

Florsheim
The  are the general antagonists of the series.

General Vamp is the leader of Florsheim's Kawasaki Branch. Though out for world domination, Vamp and his followers tend to be contributing members of society when not attempting to kill Sunred.

 
The Combat Goons are Vamp's assistants, particularly #1.
 

 Vamp's minions who go after Sunred while not enjoying their personal time.
 
Dolgon is bird kaijin who receives a beating for destroying Red's beef bowl. Dolgon works at a tavern and later in the series begins to have more feminine mannerisms and lipstick on the end of its beak.
 
Taiza is a wolf kaijin who speaks in simple repetitive words. During the new moon, he turns into an attractive young man with an IQ of 200.
 
Armor Tiger is a tiger kaijin who lives in a dirty apartment and is usually very slovenly. He is the most powerful of Florsheim's members.
 
Khamenman is a mummy-themed kaijin who is 4002 years old. He used to live with his younger brother Ant Killer and he owns a red Toyota Vitz.
 
Medaleo is a humanoid kaijin with cannons on his back. He usually hangs out with Khamenman and Usacots.
 
Geiras is a squid kaijin who can also fly. Because of his ability to fly, he helps Red and Kayoko move into their new apartment.
 
Mossky is a mosquito kaijin. He also assisted in Red's and Kayoko's move.
 
Dels is a jellyfish kaijin who arrived in Kawasaki as an amorphous blob.
 
Gyo is a humanoid kaijin with the ability to remove his hands from his body. He has a mother's boy complex.
 
Gamess is a turtle kaijin who often mentors others, such as Gyo and Mukiebi.
 
Ant Killer is an ant lion kaijin who is Khamenman's younger brother by only two years and still treats Khamenman as an older brother after 4000 years. An on-again-off-again smoker, he is most often seen with Mogira and Mogera.
 
Mogira and Mogera are two mole kaijin who are Ant Killer's assistants.
 
Seminga is a cicada kaijin who in the middle of the series undergoes metamorphosis from larva to adult, however he gets stuck in his pupa casing.
 
Mukiebi is a shrimp kaijin and resembles a steamed on tail shrimp. He has problems fitting in with other kaijin because he assumes he has a shell (mukiebi is "shelled shrimp" in Japanese) and that he can become an Animal Soldier.
 
Ganymede is a crab kaijin who lives in an apartment with poor soundproofing and often complains that he gets very little sleep.
 
Gota is an octopus kaijin who is beaten by Red during the mix up with Sa-Qoon's suit.
 
Gurugege is a frog kaijin who operates a blog where he is a critic of various ramen stands throughout Japan.
 
Kabirajay is a mold kaijin who unknowingly spreads his spores throughout the Florsheim HQ.
RX77 (SMR-KK in the anime) A robot that Vamp orders to fight Sunred, but eventually has to ask Red to put the model together.
 
Jalgo is a humanoid kaijin that Vamp has come over from Utah to fight Red. Despite his fierce reputation, he is actually a calm and controlled person who speaks English in a relatively high pitched voice.
 
Yorojishi is a lion kaijin who is in a rivalry with Armor Tiger as they are both armored large cat kaijin (Yoroijishi uses samurai armor).
 
Night Man is originally a hero and one of Sunred's juniors. He decides that he does not wish to be a hero anymore and joins Florsheim as Night Owl.

  Living stuffed toys usually lying around when not sent after Sunred. Although they are some of Florsheim's top agents, their small size and cuteness often gets in the way of their intentions.
 
 A stuffed bunny with a bionic eye, feathery wings, and sharp claws. He is serious about being in Florsheim, and is intent on destroying Sunred.
 
 A stuffed cat who is often the voice of reason. He is most often seen wearing a fanny pack. His weapon is a spike that comes out of his head.
 
 A stuffed chick who is more robotic than the others and does not speak. Among his various abilities, he can also transform into a liquid metal.
 
 A stuffed wolf who has a speech impediment, but transforms into a monstrous wolf in the light of a full moon.

Other Florsheim members
 

 
Head of the Tokyo Branch and a certified genius with a 150 IQ and a (removable) scissor hand. He performs all actions with utmost sincerity.
 
Hengel's right hand man.

 
Head of the Shizuoka Sub-Branch and Vamp's younger brother.
 
Loafer's mentor.

 
A part-time worker who serves as one of the Shizuoka Sub-Branch's Combat Goons.
 
A normal human who lives at the Shizuoka Sub-Branch to save money on rent.

 
Two Florsheim kaijin who live together.

Other heroes

  
Two heroes based in Hokkaidō who come to visit Sunred. They are extremely tall to where their heads are never in frame. It is revealed that they killed all of the members of their world conquering organization in a drunken bender.

 
A hero from Nagoya themed after the shachihoko. He used to live with Red and greatly disliked his smoking habit.

 
A hero from Tottori Prefecture and one of Red's students. When Red accidentally gets Sa-Qoon's suit from the dry cleaners he tries it on and actually fights crime in it.

 
Two heroes from Yamaguchi Prefecture and the father and older brother of Night Man (now Night Owl). They come to Kawasaki to support Night Owl's career choice of becoming a Florsheim kaijin.

  
A Super Sentai-esque team with a forest motif from Aomori Prefecture. The leader Natural Green is the nephew of the Abisilin brothers and originally was a hero from Hokkaidō who went by the name . He also previously served as a member of Weather Three (becoming Weather 4) as  until the group disbanded. After meeting up with Red, they reveal that they are going to move to Canada to fight crime instead of protecting Aomori.

Other villains

 
Devil Eye is the leader of the Devil Eye Army who tries to take the position of world-conquering organization in Kawasaki.
 
A Devil Eye member who tries to attack Vamp but is intercepted by Armor Tiger.
 
Another Devil Eye member.

 
A strange green monster that lives in the Kawasaki Florsheim HQ ceiling that sometimes appears out of nowhere and gives some advice or sing a song about Sunred.

 
Taremimi is a dog kaijin and former Animal Soldier who mentored Usacots in the past. He now works as a host under the name .

 
Barapi is a capybara kaijin who is originally hired to be a monster for Red to fight at the advent of the Year of the Rat. He later serves as a Florsheim delivery monster.

 
Doga is a grasshopper kaijin who left China for two years after an argument with his father who wanted him to only worry about the restaurant.

 
Pdora is a pteranodon kaijin who works at day and goes to night school who one day accidentally comes across Vamp.

 
Horai is an earthworm kaijin from Shimane Prefecture who works at a ramen stand.

 
Gaima is a kaijin who only appeared in his own little sketches and did not do much of anything. He apparently lives in the same apartment as Sodom and Godorah.

Other characters
 
A taxi driver who complains of the smallest noise made by Armor Tiger.

 
An old woman who has befriended the Florsheim Kawasaki Branch.

 
 
Crossover characters another manga by Makoto Kubota titled GOGO! Pudding Empire. They come to Earth to visit their dear friend Vamp.

Climate Squadron Weather Three
After he became the solo hero Sunred, his teammates went on to find new jobs.

 Having the power over rain, Weather Blue fought with Muay Thai. After Weather Three broke up, Blue became a host.

The beer-bellied Weather Yellow hails from Osaka and has the power over lightning, although due to his laziness uses a stun gun in battle. After Weather Three broke up, he took over his family's construction company back in Osaka.

A Florsheim Monster that is shown as an opponent for Weather Three in the second season of Sunred during a flashback. Pelial is a parody of Ultraman Zero's enemy, Ultraman Belial

Even in their "Theme Song" which played in the flashback, that the Weather Three team was a parody of one specific Super Sentai team, Taiyo Sentai Sun Vulcan.

Media

Manga
Astro Fighter Sunred began as a manga series written and drawn by Makoto Kubota and began its serialization in Young Gangan. Twenty volumes have been published by Flex Comix in Japan, and by Tong Li Comics in Taiwan.

Anime
Directed by Seiji Kishi and written by Makoto Uezu, an anime adaptation was produced by the animation studio AIC A.S.T.A.. The anime series consists of 26 episodes and aired in Japan from October 3, 2008 to March 27, 2009. It was broadcast on KIDS STATION, TV Kanagawa, and Nico Nico Douga. The second season began airing on October 3, 2009.

Theme songs
Opening theme 
Lyrics, Composition, & Performance: manzo
Season 1

Lyrics, Composition, & Performance: manzo
Season 2
Ending theme 
Lyrics, Composition, & Performance: Kumahachi Morino

Lyrics: Nezumi Ro-ri
Composition: Takaaki Fujioka
Arrangement: Yatsutaka Mizushima
Performance: Kumahachi Morino
Season 2

Other songs
 
 Composition: Kei Takahara
 Episode 10's ending theme
 
 Composition: manzo
 Arrangement: Shinji Kakijima
 Episode 13's opening theme
 
 Lyrics, Composition, Arrangement, & Performance: Ceiling (Tomomi Kasai) and Little Ceiling (Tomomi Itano) (Originally manzo)
 Episode 16's ending theme
 
 Lyrics, Composition, Arrangement, & Performance: Shinji Kakijima
 Opening of show within a show 
 This song, along with the Video that follows it, is in fact referencing Taiyo Sentai Sun Vulcan.
 
 Lyrics: Yoshiko Higo
 Composition: Miyuki Ishimoto
 Arrangement: Naozumi Yamamoto
 Vocals: Yoko Seri
 Chorus: Royal Knights
 Kawasaki, Kanagawa, city anthem
 Episode 33's ending theme
 
 Lyrics, Composition, Arrangement, & Performance: Shinji Kakijima
 Nightman's theme song
 Episode 43's ending theme

References

External links
 Official anime website 
 Official manga website 
 Louis Yamada LIII website 
 

Anime International Company
Anime series based on manga
Films with screenplays by Makoto Uezu
Gangan Comics manga
Manga adapted into television series
Seinen manga
Square Enix franchises